Neil Ferguson (28 November 1945 – 14 July 2016) was an Australian rules footballer who played with Hawthorn in the Victorian Football League (VFL).

Ferguson came to Hawthorn from Melbourne High School and was 18 when he made his VFL debut in 1964. He played as a ruckman but towards the end of his time at Hawthorn was also used to good effect up forward, kicking 19 goals in 1968 and 21 goals in 1969.

The second half of his football career was spent in Western Australia, with five years at East Fremantle and a season with Claremont. He was the first ruckman in East Fremantle's 1974 premiership winning side.

Ferguson died 14 July 2016 aged 70.

Ferguson won the 1983 Ovens & King Football League best and fairest, the Baker Medal, when playing for the Bright Football Club.

References

1945 births
Australian rules footballers from Victoria (Australia)
Hawthorn Football Club players
East Fremantle Football Club players
Claremont Football Club players
2016 deaths